The 2012–13 season will be BFC Siófok's 20th competitive season, 3rd consecutive season in the OTP Bank Liga and 81st year in existence as a football club.

First team squad

Transfers

Summer

In:

Out:

Winter

In:

Out:

List of Hungarian football transfers summer 2012
List of Hungarian football transfers winter 2012–13

Statistics

Appearances and goals
Last updated on 2 June 2013.

|-
|colspan="14"|Youth players:

|-
|colspan="14"|Players no longer at the club:

|}

Top scorers
Includes all competitive matches. The list is sorted by shirt number when total goals are equal.

Last updated on 2 June 2013

Disciplinary record
Includes all competitive matches. Players with 1 card or more included only.

Last updated on 2 June 2013

Overall
{|class="wikitable"
|-
|Games played || 42 (30 OTP Bank Liga, 6 Hungarian Cup and 6 Hungarian League Cup)
|-
|Games won || 12 (7 OTP Bank Liga, 4 Hungarian Cup and 1 Hungarian League Cup)
|-
|Games drawn || 7 (4 OTP Bank Liga, 0 Hungarian Cup and 3 Hungarian League Cup)
|-
|Games lost || 23 (19 OTP Bank Liga, 2 Hungarian Cup and 2 Hungarian League Cup)
|-
|Goals scored || 43
|-
|Goals conceded || 74
|-
|Goal difference || -31
|-
|Yellow cards || 90
|-
|Red cards || 8
|-
|rowspan="1"|Worst discipline ||  Szabolcs Pál (13 , 0 )
|-
|rowspan="1"|Best result || 3–0 (H) v Diósgyőri VTK – OTP Bank Liga – 16-04-2013
|-
|rowspan="1"|Worst result || 0–6 (A) v Videoton FC – OTP Bank Liga – 29-03-2013
|-
|rowspan="1"|Most appearances ||  Szabolcs Pál (35 appearances)
|-
|rowspan="2"|Top scorer ||  Szabolcs Pál (7 goals)
|-
|  Vilmos Melczer (7 goals)
|-
|Points || 43/126 (34.13%)
|-

Nemzeti Bajnokság I

Matches

Classification

Results summary

Results by round

Hungarian Cup

League Cup

Group stage

Classification

References

External links
 Eufo
 Official Website
 UEFA
 fixtures and results

BFC Siófok seasons
Hungarian football clubs 2012–13 season